The 2019-20 Colorado College Tigers men's ice hockey season was the 80th season of play for the program and the 7th in the NCHC conference. The Tigers represented Colorado College and were coached by Mike Haviland, in his 6th season.

On March 12, 2020, NCHC announced that the tournament was cancelled due to the coronavirus pandemic, before any games were played.

Roster

As of August 1, 2019.

Standings

Schedule and Results

|-
!colspan=12 style=";" | Exhibition

|-
!colspan=12 style=";" | Regular Season

|-
!colspan=12 style=";" | 

|-
!colspan=12 style=";" | 
|- align="center" bgcolor="#e0e0e0"
|colspan=12|Tournament Cancelled

Scoring Statistics

Goaltending statistics

Rankings

References

Colorado College Tigers men's ice hockey seasons
Colorado College Tigers
Colorado College Tigers
Colorado College Tigers
Colorado College Tigers